The Adi Lautman Interdisciplinary Program for Outstanding Students is a Tel Aviv University program for fostering excellence, leading to a Master's degree. Only 15 students are admitted to the program every year. "The highly competitive selection is based on applicants’ scores in the Israeli Standardized Matriculation and Psychometric exams, a short essay, a personal interview, and a concourse examination. Thus, the students participating in the program have outstanding intellectual potential and are motivated and capable of hard work and independent thinking." 

The program was established in 1985 by Prof. Yehuda Elkana, to enable exceptionally gifted students to explore and conduct interdisciplinary research. Elkana led the program for nine years, until 1994. In 1995 the program was named after the late Adi Lautman, an alumnus of the program and the son of Israeli industrialist and businessman .

The current head of the program is Prof. Lilach Hadany, an alumna of the program.

Either you can work together or you yourself should be interdisciplinary.”

Notable alumni 

 Yuval Adler, director and screenwriter, creator of the film Bethlehem
 Shimon Adaf, author and poet
 , writer and film director
 Maya Arad, writer
 Avner Dorman, composer
 Eli Drezner, professor of philosophy at Tel Aviv University
 Dov Elbaum, writer
 , neuropsychologist of language
 Ehud Gazit, biochemist, biophysicist, nanotechnologist. Former Vice President of Tel Aviv University. Former Chief Scientist of the Israeli Ministry of Science
 Ido Geiger, professor of philosophy at Ben-Gurion University
 , author and critic, winner of the Bernstein Prize
 Lilach Hadany, professor at Tel Aviv University
 Ran Hassin, professor of psychology at the Hebrew University of Jerusalem
 , author and musician 
 Assaf Inbari, writer
 Etgar Keret, writer, professor of Hebrew literature at Ben-Gurion University
 Neria Kraus, journalist
 , linguist, blogger, professor at Ben-Gurion University
 , head of the Van Leer Jerusalem Institute, professor of law at Tel Aviv University
 Reshef Levi, screenwriter, playwright, film director, producer, comedian
 Yannets Levi, writer, dramatist, TV host
 , journalist, professor of psychology at Tel Aviv University 
 , Breaking the Silence CEO (2012-2017)
 Yotam Ottolenghi, chef, restaurant owner, food writer
 Dan Pelleg, dancer and choreographer 
 , writer, winner of the Israel Prim Minister's Prize for Hebrew Authors 
 Aviv Regev, computational biologist, Executive Vice President of Genentech Research and Early Development
 Maayan Roichman, one of the first two Israeli Rhodes Scholars (2017)
 , data scientist and professor at Ben-Gurion University
 Ori Simchen, professor of philosophy at the University of British Columbia
Sivan Toledo, professor of computer science at Tel Aviv University
 Barak Weiss, professor of mathematics at Tel Aviv University
 Yair Weiss, professor of computer science at the Hebrew University of Jerusalem
 Yoad Winter, professor of linguistics at Utrecht University
 Ghil'ad Zuckermann, linguist, revivalist, professor of linguistics and endangered languages at the University of Adelaide

References 

Tel Aviv University
Education in Tel Aviv
Research in Israel
Scholarships
1985 establishments in Israel